Nicholas J Principe (born December 30, 1978) is an American actor and stuntman. He is best known for his role as ChromeSkull in Laid to Rest (2009) and its sequel, ChromeSkull: Laid to Rest 2 (2011).

Early life 
Principe was born in Warwick, Rhode Island and raised in Providence, Rhode Island. He moved from Providence to Los Angeles, California in hopes of playing monsters in films. He has cited Kane Hodder, Nick Castle, Boris Karloff as his inspiration for this desire. Principe discovered that most monsters are played by stunt performers. Already having a black belt in kenpō, and experienced in mixed martial arts fights, he started studying how to become a stuntman.

Three months after moving to Los Angeles, Principe was working in a music store and noticed a film production crew across the street. He approached a crew member, and was asked if he was a "PA", or production assistant. Ignorant of the term's meaning, Principe said that he was, and started working on the set. He ended up talking to the stunt coordinator and started doing stunt work in the film industry.

Career 
After some small roles on television series and movies, including his first role in Dead and Deader, Sands of Oblivion, Principe was cast in the role of ChromeSkull in Laid to Rest, a role he reprised in the film's 2011 sequel. Robert Green Hall, the writer-director of both films, met Principe on the set of Robert Englund's Killer Pads. After years of friendship, the pair met again at a screening of Wrong Turn 2, where Hall offered Principe the role. He based his performances on Roy Batty from Blade Runner (a performance Principe claims to base all of his characters on), Patrick Bateman from American Psycho, and Michael Myers from Halloween. Principe expressed interest in reprising his role in a third film, which he confirmed will be made when Hall's schedule opens up.

Also in 2011, Principe portrayed BLT in Brandon and Jason Trost's The FP. The film co-stars Jason Trost, Lee Valmassy, Caitlyn Folley, Art Hsu, Dov Tiefenbach, and James DeBello. It premiered at South by Southwest on March 13, 2011. He later played Damien in Madison County, Sledgesaw in Vs, also directed by Jason Trost and co-starring Valmassy, and Lori in The Summer of Massacre.

In 2013, he starred in Nobody Can Cool, Army of the Damned, and Self Storage.

In 2014, Principe starred in Seed 2: The New Breed and Ryan Nicholson's Collar. He is set to appear in American Muscle and Disciples, along with making his directorial debut, Stockholm later in the year.

Filmography

As actor

Other

References

External links 

1978 births
Living people
Actors from Providence, Rhode Island
People from Warwick, Rhode Island
American male film actors
American male television actors
Male actors from Rhode Island